The County Road I-39–Rapid River Bridge is a bridge located on County Road I-39 (Co. Rd. I-39) over the Rapid River in Masonville Township, Michigan. It was listed on the National Register of Historic Places in 1999.

Description
The bridge carrying Co. Rd. I-39 over the Rapid River is a multi-span through girder bridge constructed of concrete.

History
The Co. Rd. I-39 – Rapid River Bridge was built in 1916 by Delta Contracting Company of Escanaba, Michigan.  It was the 64th trunkline bridge built in Michigan, and once carried US 41 across the Rapid River.  When US 41 was rerouted, the bridge continued to serve as a county road.  The bridge is one of the few multi-span through girder bridge constructed of concrete still extant in Michigan, and is the oldest example of a concrete girder bridge designed for the state trunkline system. The bridge was added to the NRHP on December 9, 1999.

See also
 
 
 
 
 List of bridges on the National Register of Historic Places in Michigan
 National Register of Historic Places listings in Delta County, Michigan

References

External links

Photographs of the bridge courtesy of HistoricBridges.org

Road bridges on the National Register of Historic Places in Michigan
Bridges completed in 1916
Transportation in Delta County, Michigan
U.S. Route 41
National Register of Historic Places in Delta County, Michigan
Concrete bridges in the United States
Girder bridges in the United States
Buildings and structures in Delta County, Michigan